The Quito Open, also known as the Quite Grand Prix, was a Grand Prix affiliated men's professional tennis tournament played from 1979 to 1982. It was held in Quito in Ecuador and played on outdoor clay courts. The city is located at 2,800 m (9,200 ft) above mean sea level. The lower air pressure means breathing is more difficult for players and the ball flies faster.

Andrés Gómez was the most successful competitor at the event, winning the singles competition in 1982 and twice taking the doubles title in 1980 and 1981 partnering Chilean Hans Gildemeister.

Results

Singles

Doubles

See also
 Ecuador Open – ATP tournament held from 2015 to 2018.

References

External links
 ATP Results Archive

Clay court tennis tournaments
Tennis tournaments in Ecuador
Grand Prix tennis circuit
Defunct tennis tournaments in South America
Defunct sports competitions in Ecuador
Recurring sporting events established in 1979
Recurring sporting events disestablished in 1982